Nerone (Nero) is an opera in four acts composed by Arrigo Boito, to a libretto in Italian written by the composer. The work is a series of scenes from Imperial Rome at the time of Emperor Nero depicting tensions between the Imperial religion and Christianity, and ends with the Great Fire of Rome. Boito died in 1918 before finishing the work.

Performance history
It was eventually premiered posthumously at La Scala on May 1, 1924, conducted by Arturo Toscanini in a version of the score completed by Toscanini, Vincenzo Tommasini, and Antonio Smareglia. The role of Nero, originally intended for Francesco Tamagno, was first performed by Aureliano Pertile. The role of Asteria, a young woman torn between her love for Nero and her Christian sympathies, was created by Rosa Raisa.

The opera was very well received at its premiere, and the newly rebuilt Rome Opera House inaugurated its first season with Nerone in 1928. However, it has only been rarely performed since that time, even in Italy. It did not receive its US premiere until April 12, 1982, when it was performed in a concert version by the Opera Orchestra of New York in Carnegie Hall.

Roles

References

Further reading
Rosenthal, H. and Warrack, J. (1979) The Concise Oxford Dictionary of Opera, 2nd edition, Oxford University Press. p. 346.

External links

Operas by Arrigo Boito
Italian-language operas
Operas
Depictions of Nero in opera
Opera world premieres at La Scala
Libretti by Arrigo Boito
Operas completed by others